Bruno Nogueira Severino (born 11 March 1986) is a Portuguese footballer who plays for Barreirense.

Club career
He made his professional debut in the Segunda Liga for Barreirense on 27 November 2005 in a game against Feirense.

He made his Primeira Liga debut for Vitória de Setúbal on 4 February 2008 in a game against Naval. He came on as a half-time substitute and scored on his debut in a 1–2 loss.

References

1986 births
Sportspeople from Barreiro, Portugal
Living people
Portuguese footballers
F.C. Barreirense players
Liga Portugal 2 players
Gondomar S.C. players
Vitória F.C. players
Primeira Liga players
S.C. Beira-Mar players
C.D. Aves players
S.C. Covilhã players
S.C.U. Torreense players
C.D. Pinhalnovense players
Association football forwards